Eduard Sebovich Lusikyan (born 29 February 1984) is a Russian former professional football player.

Club career
After beginning his career with FC Zhemchuzhina Sochi, Lusikyan joined Russian Football National League side FC Volgar-Gazprom Astrakhan in 2005. He made his FNL debut for Volgar-Gazprom on 4 September 2005 in a game against FC Chkalovets-1936 Novosibirsk.

References

External links
 

1984 births
People from Tuapse
Living people
Russian footballers
Russian sportspeople of Armenian descent
Association football midfielders
FC Zhemchuzhina Sochi players
FC Volgar Astrakhan players
FC Mordovia Saransk players
FC Chernomorets Novorossiysk players
FC Armavir players
FC Orenburg players
FC Chayka Peschanokopskoye players
Sportspeople from Krasnodar Krai